Safety certificate may refer to:

 Safety certificate (EU railway), issued by a national safety authority to a railway company in the European Union under the EU directive 2016/798
 Landlord's gas safety certificate, required by United Kingdom for all rental accommodations
 Safety certification, for professionals operating in the domains of safety, health, or the environment